Beautiful Ballads & Love Songs is a compilation album by American jazz musician Miles Davis that was released on January 15, 2008, by Columbia Records.

Track listing 
"'Round Midnight" (Hanighen, Monk, Williams) – 5:58
"Summer Night" (Dubin, Warren) – 6:00
"Corcovado (Quiet Nights)" (Jobim) – 2:44
"Stella by Starlight" (Washington, Young) – 4:45
"My Ship" (Gershwin, Weill) – 4:33
"I Thought About You" (Mercer, VanHeusen) – 4:55
"Bess, You Is My Woman Now" (Gershwin, Gershwin, Heyward) – 5:11
"Blue in Green" (Davis) – 5:38
"I Loves You Porgy" (Gershwin, Gershwin, Heyward) – 3:42
"I Fall in Love Too Easily" (Cahn, Styne) – 6:46
"Time After Time" (Hyman, Lauper) – 3:41
"My Funny Valentine" (Hart, Rodgers) – 14:53

Charts

References

2006 compilation albums
Miles Davis compilation albums
Albums produced by George Avakian
Albums produced by Teo Macero
Albums produced by Miles Davis
Albums produced by Robert Irving III
Albums produced by Cal Lampley
Albums produced by Irving Townsend
Columbia Records compilation albums
Legacy Recordings compilation albums
Covers albums